The 2016 Vuelta a España began on 21 August, with Stage 21 scheduled for 11 September. The 2016 edition of the cycle race began with the only team time trial stage of the race, just outside Ourense.

Classification standings

Stage 1
20 August 2016 — Ourense – Parque Náutico Castrelo de Miño, team time trial (TTT)

Stage 2
21 August 2016 — Ourense – Baiona,

Stage 3
22 August 2016 — Marín – Dumbría, Mirador de Ézaro,

Stage 4
23 August 2016 — Betanzos – San Andrés de Teixido,

Stage 5
24 August 2016 — Viveiro – Lugo,

Stage 6
25 August 2016 — Monforte de Lemos – Ribeira Sacra, Luintra,

Stage 7
26 August 2016 — Maceda – Puebla de Sanabria,

Stage 8
27 August 2016 — Villalpando – La Camperona, Valle de Sabero,

Stage 9
28 August 2016 — Cistierna – Alto del Naranco, Oviedo,

Stage 10
29 August 2016 — Lugones – Lagos de Covadonga,

Stage 11
31 August 2016 — Jurassic Museum of Asturias, Colunga – Peña Cabarga,

Notes

References

Stage 01
Vuelta a España stages